Una-Una (Indonesian: Pulau Una-Una) is an Indonesian island, part of the Togian Islands in the Gulf of Tomini.

Una-Una is a small volcanic island created by the Colo volcano. Its vegetation primarily consists of coconut trees.
Most of the island was devastated by pyroclastic flows following an eruption of the volcano in 1983. Currently its population is approximately 200 inhabitants and is concentrated in the island's 3 villages: Unauna, Kololio and Tampobatu. The island is part of the Central Sulawesi province.

Una Una is surrounded by thriving reefs home to big schools of fish. It has been known as a location for scubadiving since the 1990s.

Gallery

References

Islands of Sulawesi